Muhammad Ziaullah Khan Chishti (born 1971) is a Pakistani-American investor and business executive. He is the founder of Afiniti and TRG Global.

After starting his career as a Morgan Stanley investment banker, Chishti invented the medical device Invisalign and co-founded Align Technology to market the product in 1997. He served as CEO of Align until 2003, when he founded the investment fund The Resource Group. In 2005 he co-founded both Orthoclear and Afiniti, the latter of which develops artificial intelligence for use in customer call centers. Chishti was a named inventor on around 150 issued patents by 2018, and had co-founded three unicorn startup companies.  In 2021, he resigned after accusations of sexual harassment and violence in his career were made public.

Early life and education 
Zia Chishti was born as Wilson Lear in 1971 in Bar Harbor, Maine. His father was American and his mother Pakistani, and after the death of his father in 1974, he and his mother moved to Lahore, Pakistan. At that time, his name was legally changed to Zia Chishti. Although Chishti intended to pursue a business career in Pakistan after graduating from the Lahore American School, he was persuaded by his mother to return to the United States. In 1988 he moved to New York City to begin attending Columbia University, where he earned a BA in computer science and economics in 1992.

Chishti subsequently became an investment banker at Morgan Stanley, working in New York and London on mergers and acquisitions. He also worked for McKinsey & Company as a management consultant in London. In 1997 he graduated from Stanford University in California with an MBA.

Career

Invisalign Technology 
Undergoing a course of orthodontic treatment in his early twenties, Chishti envisioned clear plastic appliances instead of metal braces. Working on the project in his dorm room at Stanford University, his invention, Invisalign, allowed computers to customize plastic retainers to gradually shift patient's teeth. Serving as founding CEO and chairman, in 1997 he co-founded the medical device company Align Technology in Sunnyvale, California. The Food and Drug Administration granted Align Technology approval to sell and market Invisalign in 1998. Chishti secured funding from Kleiner Perkins Caulfield & Byers, and the company had raised around $140 million in venture capital by 2000. Align Technology listed on the NASDAQ in January 2001 with a valuation of $1 billion. Chishti left Align Technology in 2003 and sold his shares in the company.

The Resource Group and Orthoclear 

After leaving Align Technology, Chishti became the founding chairman and CEO of The Resource Group (TRG). As his first acquisition with TRG, he purchased the Pakistani operations of Align Technology in Lahore, which Align had shed in 2001. Chishti "took the abandoned office filled with laid-off workers and asked them to trust his vision for a call-center empire." Chishti listed TRG on the Karachi Stock Exchange in July 2003. By 2005, the company had operations in Karachi and Lahore and was supporting and acquiring American call centers.

In 2005, Chishti and several former Align Technology employees founded the medical device company Orthoclear. The company settled a patent infringement lawsuit filed by Align in 2006, with Align purchasing Orthoclear's intellectual property for $20 million. Chishti subsequently returned his attention to TRG.

Afiniti and unicorn valuations 
In 2005 Chishti founded Afiniti in Washington, D.C., with TRG holding approximately half of the startup's stock. Serving as CEO and chairman, Chishti wrote the first draft of Afiniti's software on his dining room table in 2006. The product uses artificial intelligence to help companies increase call center efficiency. Afiniti had a valuation of $1.6 billion by 2017 and was considered a unicorn, which are companies valued at over $1 billion. Chishti continued to serve as Afiniti's CEO and chairman of the board, which also included directors such as John W. Snow and José Maria Aznar.

By 2017, The Resource Group was operating as an equity vehicle with a number of subsidiaries, for example the offshore company TRG International. It primarily invested in "business process outsourcing (BPO) and related technology companies," according to Chishti. By 2018, Chishti was a named inventor on around 150 issued patents and had founded three unicorn companies. He was awarded the Sitara-e-Imtiaz Award for IT by Pakistani President Mamnoon Hussain in March 2018. That April, Chishti was also a recipient of the MIT AI Innovator Award.

Views on artificial intelligence 

Chishti has been a critic of the "hype" surrounding artificial intelligence, arguing society is headed for another AI winter. He has stated that the benefits of artificial intelligence are evolutionary, rather than revolutionary, and current successful use cases of the technology revolve around the identification of patterns within complex data, including medical image anomaly detection, hydrocarbon detection, consumer behavioral predication and fraud detection.

Personal life 

In July 2001, People Magazine listed Chishti among the top 50 bachelors in the United States. Chishti works out of Washington, D.C. He is an avid chess player and skier.

In 2020, Chishti married Sarah Pobereskin in Bermuda.

Sexual assault accusations 

On November 16, 2021, a former female employee of Afiniti, Tatiana Spottiswoode, testified in front of the United States House Committee on the Judiciary that after months of sexual harassment, Chishti sexually assaulted and beat her while they were traveling together on a business trip to Brazil in 2017. It was also alleged that he grabbed her buttocks in front of coworkers, and called her a "bitch" after she refused to hold his hand.

On November 18, 2021, Chishti left his roles at Afiniti. On November 28, 2021, he resigned from all roles at TRG and its affiliates.

In December 2022, Chishti filed a federal defamation lawsuit against Spottiswoode, saying she had "weaponized" a "consensual love affair" and had lied under oath.  The lawsuit was criticized as a disincentive to speak against rich abusers who could afford to bully witnesses with the threat of expensive litigation. A week later, the House Judiciary Committee that Spottiswoode had testified to entered a 2019 arbitration tribunal ruling into the Congressional Record in support of the veracity of Spottiswoode's claims.  Journalist Michael Schaffer called the document "utterly devastating for Chishti": the arbitrator and his investigation had found that Chishti's conduct was "outrageous in character and extreme in degree, going beyond all possible bounds of decency"; that Chisti had groped Spottiswoode in front of colleagues, insulted her, brutally beat her, and had then lied about his activities after the fact; that Chishti had harassed other young female Afiniti employees and they had received monetary settlements in addition to Spottiswoode; and that the company had taken no action to attempt to prevent similar conduct from occurring in the future.  It is speculated that Spottiswoode could not release the document herself without breaking the confidentiality requirements and imperiling her settlement, hence why the Judiciary Committee did it instead.

References

External links 
 Biography at Afiniti 

Living people
1971 births
20th-century American inventors
21st-century American inventors
American people of Pakistani descent
American chief executives
American emigrants to Pakistan
American patent holders
Columbia College (New York) alumni
Lahore American School alumni
Recipients of Sitara-i-Imtiaz
Stanford University alumni